

LNFA

Results by round

Matches

Algerian Cup

MO Constantine seasons
Algerian football clubs 2013–14 season